Laciniaria is a genus of small air-breathing land snails, terrestrial pulmonate gastropod mollusks in the subfamily Clausiliinae of the family Clausiliidae, the door snails.

Species
Species within the genus Laciniaria include:
 Laciniaria bajula (A. Schmidt, 1868)
 Laciniaria exalta (Westerlund, 1878)
 Laciniaria macilenta (Rossmässler, 1842)
 Laciniaria plicata (Draparnaud, 1801)
Species brought into synonymy
 Laciniaria erberi Frauenfeld, 1867: synonym of Strigillaria denticulata erberi (Frauenfeld, 1867) (original combination)

References

 Bank, R. A. (2017). Classification of the Recent terrestrial Gastropoda of the World. Last update: July 16th, 2017

External links
 Nomenclator Zoologicus info
 Hartmann, J.D.W. (1840-1844). Erd- und Süsswasser-Gasteropoden der Schweiz. Mit Zugabe einiger merkwürdigen exotischen Arten, i-xx

Clausiliidae